Gackle may refer to:

 Gackle, North Dakota, an American city
 William Gackle (born 1927), American politician